This is a list of political parties, organizations, and movements that have been claimed to follow some form of fascist ideology. Since definitions of fascism vary, entries in this list may be controversial. For a discussion of the various debates surrounding the nature of fascism, see Fascism and ideology and Definitions of fascism. For a general list of fascist movements, see List of fascist movements.

This list has been divided into four sections for reasons of length:
 List of fascist movements by country A–F
 List of fascist movements by country G–M
 List of fascist movements by country N–T
 List of fascist movements by country U–Z

Governments

Fascists

* indicates "FASCISM in COUNTRY" links.

Nazis

Political parties
Action Front of National Socialists/National Activists (defunct)
 Afrikaner Weerstandsbeweging
  Albanian Fascist Party (defunct)
  American Nazi Party
  Arrow Cross Party (defunct)
 Artgemeinschaft
 Balli Kombëtar (defunct)
  Brazilian Integralist Action (defunct)
  British Union of Fascists (defunct)
 Christian Party (defunct)
  Concordia Association (defunct)
 Croix-de-Feu (defunct)
 Faisceau (defunct)
  Falange Española Tradicionalista y de las JONS (defunct)
 Fascist People's Party of Sweden (defunct)
  Fatherland Front (defunct)
 Finnish National Socialist Labor Organisation (defunct)
 Finnish People's Organisation (defunct)
 Finnish Realm Union (defunct)
 Finnish-Socialist Workers' Party (defunct)
  Freethinkers' Party (defunct)
 French National-Collectivist Party (defunct)
 French Popular Party (defunct)
 Friends of New Germany (defunct)
  German American Bund (defunct)
  German Workers' Party (defunct)
 Golden Square (defunct)
 Greek National Socialist Party (defunct)
 Hellenic Socialist Patriotic Organisation (defunct)
  Iron Guard (defunct)
  Kataeb Party
 Kokumin Dōmei (defunct)
 Blue Shirts Society (Kuomintang) (defunct)
 Kuomintang (Wang Jingwei) (defunct)
 Lalli Alliance of Finland (defunct)
 Lapua Movement (defunct)
 Montenegrin Federalist Party (defunct)
 Mouvement Franciste (defunct)
  Nasjonal Samling (defunct)
  Nationaal-Socialistische Beweging (defunct)
  National Christian Party (defunct)
  National Democratic Party of Germany
 National Fascist Community (defunct)
  National Fascist Party (defunct)
 National Partnership (defunct)
 National Popular Rally (defunct)
  National Pro Patria Party (defunct)
 National Radical Camp
 National Social Movement (Bulgaria) (defunct)
 National Socialist Bloc (defunct)
 National Socialist Bulgarian Workers Party (defunct)
 National Socialist Union of Finland (defunct)
 National Socialist Workers' Party (Sweden) (defunct)
  National Socialist Workers' Party of Denmark (defunct)
 National Socialists of Finland (defunct)
  National Union (defunct)
 National Union of Greece (defunct)
  National Unity Party (Haiti)
  Nazi Party (defunct)
 New Swedish Movement (defunct)
 New Swedish People's League (defunct)
 Organisation of National Socialists (defunct)
  Organization of Ukrainian Nationalists (defunct)
 Party of Finnish Labor (defunct)
 Patriotic People's Movement (defunct)
 Patriotic People's Party (defunct)
 Ratniks (defunct)
  Republican Fascist Party (defunct)
 Revolutionary Social Movement (defunct)
  Rexist Party (defunct)
 Rising Finland (defunct)
 Rodna Zashtita (defunct)
 Sammarinese Fascist Party (defunct)
  Silver Legion of America (defunct)
 Slovak People's Party (defunct)
 Socialist Reich Party (defunct)
 Stormers (Finland) (defunct)
 Sudeten German Party (defunct)
 Swedish National Socialist Farmers' and Workers' Party (defunct)
 Swedish National Socialist Party (defunct)
 Swedish National Socialist Unity (defunct)
 Tōhōkai (defunct)
  Union of Bulgarian National Legions (defunct)
  Ustaša – Croatian Revolutionary Movement (defunct)
 Yugoslav National Movement (defunct)
 Yugoslav Radical Union (defunct)
 Zveno (defunct)

Alliances
  Sino-German Cooperation
  Harzburg Front
  Tripartite Pact
   Anti-Comintern Pact
  Pact of Steel
  Rome Protocols
  Croatian–Romanian–Slovak friendship proclamation

See also
 Extremism
 Far-right politics
 Ultranationalism
 Right-wing politics
 Right-wing populism
 Right-wing terrorism
 Metaxism
 Neo-Fascism
 Nazism
 Neo-Nazism
 Far-right subcultures
 Alt-right
 Authoritarianism
 Totalitarianism
 Strasserism
 Expansionism
 Anti-Communism
 Anti-Sovietism
 Racial supremacy

External links
 Link directory for many Latin American Falangist movements
 Chronology of the Iron Guard, documenting many Romanian Fascist movements